Eiao is the largest of the extreme northwestern Marquesas Islands.  The island is uninhabited, but is administratively part of the commune (municipality) of Nuku-Hiva, itself in the administrative subdivision of the Marquesas Islands.

Geography

The center of this island is a high plateau, rising on the east side to 576 metres above sea level (1,890 feet), much of which has been devastated by herds of feral sheep brought here by mankind. There is one good anchorage, found on the western side of the island at Vaituha.

History
In pre-European times, the bodies of chiefs from parts of Te I'i were taken to Eiao for burial.

Eiao was at one time home to a Marquesan tribe called the Tuametaki. Archaeological investigations have discovered workshops for the production of stone tools, especially adzes, made from local basalt. These tools have been found in archaeological sites on other islands, providing evidence for prehistoric interisland voyaging within this island group. The population of the island during this phase was estimated at between 600 and 900 people.

The first non-Polynesian encounter with the island was in 1791 by the American sea captain Joseph Ingraham, who named it Knox Island in honour of the U.S. Secretary of War at that time, Henry Knox. Other names given to this island by Western explorers include Masse, Fremantle, and Robert. The island was uninhabited at the time of its "discovery" by Europeans.

In the late 19th century, the island was briefly used as a leper colony island, although that enterprise was eventually abandoned because of the frequent droughts, and the difficulty of reliably landing supplies on the island.  In the 1970s, the island was the site of extensive French military activity, while it was being explored as a possible site for nuclear weapons testing. This island and its surrounding rocks were declared the Eiao Island Nature Reserve in 1992, as a first step toward protecting its ecosystem — including a number of endangered species, some of which are endemic. Before the creation of the reserve, the Eiao monarch, a bird in the order passeriformes, became extinct.

In May 2022 public consultations began on listing the island as a UNESCO World Heritage Site.

Climate

See also 

 Louis Le Breton
 Marquesan Nature Reserves

References

Islands of the Marquesas Islands
Uninhabited islands of French Polynesia
Former populated places in Oceania